Govt. K. C. College is a co-educational Bangladeshi Government college. It was established in 1960 by the then Pakistani government. The college is situated in the heart of Jhenaidah. There are 12,000 students both male and female who study here. Local MP(Member of Parliament) is the president of the managing committee.

History
Govt. K. C. College is one of the most important colleges in Bangladesh. It was established in 1960 by the then Pakistani government. The college is situated in the heart of Jhenaidah. There are about 12,000 students both male and female who study here. Local MP (Member of Parliament) is the president of the managing committee.

References

Colleges in Jhenaidah District
Universities and colleges in Jhenaidah District